The Spyker D8 Peking-to-Paris is a mid-size luxury crossover SUV produced by the Dutch car manufacturer Spyker Cars. The car was designed by Michiel van den Brink and introduced at the 2006 Geneva Motor Show as the D12. With a change in proposed engine to a V8, the Peking-to-Paris was renamed D8.

The name Peking-to-Paris refers to the Peking to Paris endurance rally held in 1907 from Peking (now called Beijing) in China to Paris in France, in which an almost standard Spyker car participated, driven by Frenchman Ch. Goddard. The Spyker car came in second in the rally after a three-month drive.

Although the D8 is a crossover SUV, it shares many design features found on Spyker's other sports cars such as the C8. Among these features are the D8's aluminum "aeroblade" wheels and one piece aluminum rear view mirrors. Also notable is that the back seat doors are hinged at the rear, giving the D8 suicide doors.

D12
The D12 was initially shown to the public at Geneva Motor Show in 2006. After the introduction in Geneva, the model already received "well over 100 orders".

D8
At a press conference held at the Geneva motor show on March 2, 2010, Spyker's CEO Victor Muller indicated that the development of the car could now be assisted by Saab, which Spyker briefly owned. The car was still under development at the time and had potential for production by 2014.

References

External links

Spyker Cars (official website)
Supercars.net on the Spyker D12
The newest 2009 Spyker D12 blueprints

All-wheel-drive vehicles
D12
Luxury sport utility vehicles
Crossover sport utility vehicles